Online youth radicalization is the action in which a young individual or a group of people come to adopt increasingly extreme political, social, or religious ideals and aspirations that reject, or undermine the status quo or undermine contemporary ideas and expressions of a state, which they may or may not reside in. Online youth radicalization can be both violent or non-violent.

The phenomenon often referred to as "incitement to radicalization towards violent extremism" (or "violent radicalization") has grown in recent years. This is mainly in relation to the Internet and social media in particular. In response to the increased attention on online "incitement to extremism and violence", attempts to prevent this phenomenon have created challenges for freedom of expression. These range from indiscriminate blocking, censorship over-reach (affecting both journalists and bloggers), and privacy intrusions—right through to the suppression or instrumentalization of media at the expense of independent credibility.

In a quick and easy way to show action after terrorist attacks, political pressure is put on social media companies, and it is easy to accuse social media companies of responsibility and call them to do more to prevent online radicalization of young people leading to violent extremism. UNESCO calls for "a policy that is constructed on the basis of facts and evidence, and not founded on hunches—or driven by panic and fearmongering."

Cyberspace is used to denote the Internet, as a network of networks, and social media as a social network that may combine various Internet platforms and applications to exchange and publish online: the online production of radical (political, social, religious) resources or content, the presence of terrorist or radicalized groups within the social networks, and the participation of young people in radical conversations.

Definitions and approaches 
While there is no consensus definition, broadly speaking "radicalization" refers to a process in which individuals are moved towards beliefs deemed "extreme" by the status quo. Not all processes of radicalization, however, have acts of violence as either their goal or their outcome. Concern is with radicalization processes which intentionally result in violence, and particularly when that violence is terroristic in targeting civilians. Communications—online and offline—play a part in radicalization processes, along with events and how individuals interpret their life experiences.

Yet distinctions need to be made between communications that may be perceived as "extreme", but which do not rise to the level of constituting criminal incitement or recruitment, and those which advocate for violent acts to be committed. Although scholars emphasize different aspects, there are three main recurring characteristics in the way that they conceptualize specifically violent radicalization.

In this sense, the concept of violent radicalization (or radicalization leading to violent acts) covers an observable process involving the individual person's search for fundamental meaning, origin and return to a root ideology, the polarization of the social space and the collective construction of a threatened ideal "us" against "them", where others are dehumanized by a process of scapegoating, a group's adoption of violence as a legitimate means for the expansion of root ideologies and related oppositional objectives.

Two major schools of theory can be discerned in the reception of the Internet and social media. These schools largely originate in pre-digital media, but are still being applied (usually implicitly) to the Internet era. The effects-based school perceives the Internet and social media as highly powerful means of communication and propaganda that over-determine other communication tools and processes. Social media are seen as highly effective drivers of propaganda, conspiracy theories and the rise of extremism through de-sensitization which leads to individuals accepting the use of violence. The uses-based school sheds doubts on the structuring effects of social media by empirically identifying only indirect and limited effects. In this paradigm, "the role of social media in violent radicalization and extremism constitutes a reflection of real offline social ruptures".

Youth and violent extremism

Specificities of social media 
The Internet has remained a medium for the spread of narratives. It has often been mistaken as a driver of violent extremism rather than the medium that it is. Unfortunately, social media has not only been used to bring people closer, to share thoughts and opinions, but also to spread false information. Additionally, the application of privacy rules has made it easier for closing the niche and advancing the targeting of vulnerable individuals. These privacy rules through welcomed, have made the process of analysis for prevention; challenging.

Chatrooms 
Chatrooms can be embedded within most Internet-based media. Reports that have looked into the use of chatrooms by violent extremist groups describe these as the space where at-risk youth without previous exposure would be likely to come across radicalizing religious narratives. This falls in line with Sageman's emphasis on the role of chatrooms and forums, based on his distinction between websites as passive sources of news and chat rooms as active sources of interaction. According to Sageman, "networking is facilitated by discussion forums because they develop communication among followers of the same ideas (experiences, ideas, values), reinforce interpersonal relationships and provide information about actions (tactics, objectives, tutorials)". Chatrooms can also include spaces where extremist people share information such as photos, videos, guides, and manuals. Discussion forums such as Reddit, 4chan, and 8chan have become focal points on internet meme-based and other forms of radicalization.

Facebook 
Many extremist groups are ideologically and strategically anti-Facebook, but a strong presence still exists on this platform either directly or through supporters. Facebook does not seem to be used for direct recruitment or planning, possibly because it has mechanisms of tracking and can link users with real places and specific times. Facebook appears to have been more often used by extremists as a decentralized center for the distribution of information and videos or a way to find like-minded supporters and show support rather than direct recruitment. This may be on the possibility that young sympathizers can share information and images and create Facebook groups in a decentralized way.

The terrorist perpetrator of the Christchurch mosque shootings live-streamed a video of the attacks on Facebook resulting in the deaths of 51 people which was shared extensively on social media. Facebook and Twitter became more active in banning extremists from their platform in the wake of the tragedy. Facebook pages associated with Future Now Australia have been removed from the platform, including their main page, "Stop the Mosques and Save Australia." On March 28, Facebook announced that they have banned white nationalist and white separatist content along with white supremacy.

Twitter 
Micro-blogging sites like Twitter present more advantages for extremist groups because traceability of the identity and the source of the tweets are harder to achieve, thus increasing the communication potential for recruiters. Analyses of Twitter feeds generated by Islamist violent extremist groups show that they are mostly used for engaging with the opposition and the authorities, in what appear to be tweetclashes that mobilize the two sides, and also used for provocation. Through Twitter, extremists can easily comment publicly on international events or personalities in several languages, enabling the activists to be vocal and timely when mounting campaigns.

YouTube and other video platforms 
YouTube has the advantage of being difficult to trace the identity of people posting content, while offering the possibility for users to generate comments and share contents. Several researchers have conducted content analyses of YouTube and Facebook extremist discourses and video contents to identify the production features most used, including their modus operandi and intended effects. Studies that have focused on the rhetorical strategy of extremist groups show the multifaceted use of online resources by extremist groups. That is, they produce "hypermedia seduction" via the use of visual motifs that are familiar to young people online; and they provide content in several languages, mostly Arabic, English and French using subtitles or audio dubbing, to increase the recruitment capacity of youth across nations. These videos provide rich media messaging that combines nonverbal cues and vivid images of events that can evoke psychological and emotional responses as well as violent reactions. Terrorists capture their attacks on video and disseminate them though the Internet, communicating an image of effectiveness and success. Such videos in turn are used to mobilize and recruit members and sympathizers. Videos also serve as authentication and archive, as they preserve live footage of actual damage and they validate terrorist performance acts. In 2018, researchers from the Data & Society thinktank identified the YouTube recommendation system as promoting a range of political positions from mainstream libertarianism and conservatism to overt white nationalism.

Other areas of the social media scape: video games 
Video games can be placed in a similar category as social media because they increasingly have their own forums, chatrooms and microblogging tools. Video games, widely used by young people, are under-researched in relation to extremism and violent radicalization. There is mostly anecdotal evidence that ISIS supporters have proposed modified versions of some games to spread propaganda (Grand Theft Auto 5) formats that allow players act as terrorists attacking Westerners (ARMA III) and provide for hijacking of images and titles such as Call of Duty to allude to a notion of jihad.

Selepack used qualitative textual analysis of hate-based video games found on right-wing religious supremacist groups’ websites to explore the extent to which they advocate violence. The results show that most hate groups were portrayed positively, and that video games promoted extreme violence towards people represented as Black or Jewish people. The games were often modified versions of classic video games in which the original enemies were replaced with religious, racial and/or ethnic minorities. Their main purpose is to indoctrinate players with white supremacist ideology and allow those who already hold racist ideologies to practice aggressive scripts toward minorities online, which may later be acted upon offline. Some experimental social psychologists show that cumulative violent video games can increase hostile expectations and aggressive behavior.

Uses of Internet and social media by extremist groups 
The Internet and social media have numerous advantages for extremist groups using religion as part of a radicalization strategy. The advantages stem from the very nature of Internet and social media channels and the way they are used by extremist groups. These include communication channels that are not bound to national jurisdictions and are informal, large, cheap, decentralized, and anonymous. This allows terrorists to network across borders and to bypass time and space. Specifically, these channels provide networks of recruiters, working horizontally in all the countries they target due to the transborder nature of the Internet.

Weinmann describes extremist groups’ use of Internet and social media in eight process strategies: "psychological warfare, publicity and propaganda, data mining, fundraising, recruitment and mobilization, networking, information sharing and planning and coordination". Conway identifies five-core terrorist uses of the Internet and social media: "information provision, financing, networking, recruitment and information gathering". The ones most relevant to social media and radicalization of young people are information provision, such as profiles of leaders, manifestos, publicity and propaganda, and recruitment. Some studies show that social media enables people to isolate themselves in an ideological niche by seeking and consuming only information consistent with their views (confirmation bias), as well as simultaneously self-identifying with geographically distant international groups, which creates a sense of community that transcends geographic borders. This ability to communicate can promote membership and identity quests faster and in more efficient ways than in the "real" social world.

While recruitment is not an instantaneous process, it is seen in the literature as a phase of radicalization, taking the process to a new level of identification and possible action. Indoctrination is easier post-recruitment and often occurs in specific virtual spaces where the extremist rhetoric is characterized by a clear distinction between "them" (described negatively) and "us" (described positively), and where violent actions are legitimized according to the principle of "no other option available". These advantages of the Internet and social media open up prospects for extremist groups, by facilitating what used to be referred previously as block recruitment and by substituting group decision to individual decision-making.

Political radicalization 
Some reports show that extreme right-wing groups take advantage of the freedom of speech guaranteed by many countries’ legislations to post hateful comments that fall short of hate-speech or other illegal acts. Furthermore, these groups seem to mobilize efforts on the Internet and social media to convey a more acceptable public image and recruit new members who would otherwise be offended by blatantly racist or hate-based discourse.

For example, the discourse found on the racial hate website Stormfront is particularly noteworthy because it clearly shows the transition towards a more "acceptable" form of racist discourse. The discourses seem to be less aggressive, even condemning violence and refusing to resort to an incendiary rhetoric. Instead, the discourses that are posted use seemingly scientific or intellectual theories about racial differences, in a watered-down version of racist discourse, relying on apparently reliable sources of information that appeal to the general public. More specifically, the racist discourses used by Stormfront relies on an "us" vs. "them" rhetoric, portraying them or ‘the other’ in five ways as: a) tyrannical (submits white people to rules and laws that serve him, e.g., Jews control the media and the economy); b) manipulator (uses deceit to achieve aims, e.g., brainwashing children with pro-black school programs); c) genocidal (e.g., multiculturalism and interracial marriage are seen as ways to eradicate the white race); d) inferior (e.g., less capacities than white people); and e) a false martyr (e.g., manipulates history to be seen as a victim).

Some researchers argue that cyberspace is enabling the creation of an extremist right-wing collective identity and a sense of belonging on a global scale via a process of networking, sharing of information (values, symbols and fears, not just facts), discussion, recruitment, and event organization, much like fundamentalist religious movements. Some researchers argue that spreading the message to a larger audience and inspiring violence can make recruitment easier, but there is no evidence that it leads to a full process of violent radicalization or actual acts of violence being committed.

Reception and influence on youth 
Bouzar, Caupenne and Sulayman (2014) present the results of interviews with 160 French families with radicalized (though not violent) children aged mainly between 15 and 21. The vast majority of the youth interviewed claimed to have been radicalized through the Internet. This held true regardless of their family characteristics and dynamics. The vast majority of the families (80%) did not follow any specific religious beliefs or practices and only 16% belonged to the working class.

Wojcieszak analysed cross-sectional and textual data obtained from respondents in neo-Nazi online discussion forums. The author found that "extremism increases with increased online participation, probably as a result of the informational and normative influences within the online groups". In addition, exposure to different parties/views offline that are dissimilar to the extremist group's values has in some instances reinforced radical beliefs online.

Many authors hypothesize potential causation by associating online radicalization with external factors such as: search for identity and meaning, the growing inequalities in European and other societies, unemployment and fewer opportunities for development especially for minority youth, exclusion, discrimination and inequality that are massively used in extremist discourses.

Social media and violent radicalization

In the Arab World 
The analysis of the profiles of researchers and publications on violent radicalization from the Arab world reveals the prominence of specialists on Islamist movements. They are, most often, humanities and social science researchers and some are specialists in media and public opinion, international relations, or even security. Another specificity of research on violent radicalization in the Arabic-speaking region is the involvement of religious researchers in this field. The main objective of this contribution is part of a state strategy to counter faith advocated by violent radical groups. In this logic, radicalization or jihadism are replaced by the term terrorist in referral to these groups. In other regions, experts use terms such as jihadist Salafism or jihadism or violent radicalization. There is a clear tendency among most Arabic-speaking researchers to avoid the use of the word Islam and its semantic field to denote violent radical groups. This is also why researchers from the region prefer to use the Arabic acronym Daesh or the State Organization instead of the ‘Islamic State.’ Most research published from the Arab world does not focus on the relation between violent radicalization and Internet or social media, nor does it evaluate the effect of prevention or intervention cyberinitiatives.

Arab youth are major consumers of social media networks and especially Facebook, which is one of the top ten most used sites by Arab Internet users, a tendency that quickly found its translation into the Arab political realm. According to a study by Mohamed Ibn Rachid Faculty for governance in the United Arab Emirates, the number of Facebook users in 22 Arab countries increased from 54.5 million in 2013 to 81.3 million in 2014 with a majority being young people. The study of literature in the region reveals the role played by social networks, especially Facebook and Twitter, as platforms for collective expression for Arab youth on current issues, conflicts and wars (e.g., Gaza situation in particular). In Iraq, for example, young Internet users and bloggers launched several campaigns on Facebook and Twitter at the beginning of military operations to free the major cities occupied by ISIS (Fallujah and Mosul). In Morocco, other initiatives with the same objective were launched such as the one by Hamzah al-Zabadi on Facebook ( مغاربة_ضد_داعش# ; Moroccans against Daesh), which consisted of sharing all kinds of content (images, texts,etc.) to contradict and challenge ISIS's narratives. The involvement of civil society actors on the web in the fight against terrorism and violent radicalization in the Arab region remains modest for many reasons including the lack of media policies dedicated to this struggle.

In Asia 
Researchers in Asia have developed a complex understanding of radicalization as being deeply connected to psychosocial and economic grievances such as poverty and unemployment, marginalization through illiteracy and lack of education, admiration for charismatic leaders, pursuit of social acceptability, and psychological trauma. These factors are considered by authors to facilitate online radicalization-oriented recruitment, especially among young people, who are more vulnerable and spend more time online.

A 2016 report by "We Are Social" revealed that East Asia, Southeast Asia, and North America were the first, second, and third largest social media markets worldwide respectively. According to the same report, Facebook and Facebook Messenger are the predominant social and communications tools, followed by Twitter, Line and Skype. China is the notable exception as Facebook Messenger is outpaced by far by Chinese social media tools. China presents a very different profile from most countries in its mainstream social media and networks. American platforms such as Google, Yahoo!, Facebook, Twitter and YouTube have very little market penetration due to state restrictions and the strong monopoly of homegrown search engines and Internet platforms in Chinese language.

There is rising interest among Chinese researchers in examining the relationship between social media and violent radicalization. Research into violent radicalization and terrorism in China is mainly focused on radicalization in Xinjiang. This could be linked to the fact that most of the recent terrorist attacks in China were not perpetrated by local residents, but by outsider violent extremist organizations that seek to separate the Xinjiang area from China. Terrorist organizations spread their messages via TV, radio and the Internet. Though there is no empirical evidence linking youth radicalization to online social media, the anonymity and transborder capacity of such media is seen as a "support for organized terrorist propaganda". The Chinese government has been responding to terrorist attacks by taking down sites, blocking and filtering content. In return, Chinese government also uses the social media for messaging against terrorism.

Indonesia has an estimated 76 million Indonesians who connect regularly on Facebook, establishing the nation as the fourth largest user of the world, after India, the United States and Brazil. Indonesia is also the fifth largest user of Twitter, after the United States, Brazil, Japan and the United Kingdom. The Institute for Policy Analysis of Conflict (IPAC) examines how Indonesian extremists use Facebook, Twitter and various mobile phone applications such as WhatsApp and Telegram. Social media use by extremists in Indonesia is increasing. They use social media, such as Facebook and Twitter, to communicate with young people, to train and to fundraise online. Recruitment is done through online games, propaganda videos on YouTube and calls to purchase weapons. The proliferation of ISIS propaganda via individual Twitter accounts has raised concerns about the possibility of "lone actor" attacks. That being said, the report points out that such attacks are extremely rare in Indonesia.

In Africa 
There is little contemporary research on online radicalization in Sub-Saharan Africa. Yet Africa carries at its heart a powerful extremist group: "Boko Haram" whose real name is Jama’atu Ahlu-Sunna wal Jihad Adda’wa Li («Group of the People of Sunnah for Preaching and Jihad») since 2002 and has pledged allegiance to the Daesh. The network is less resourceful and financed compared to Daesh, but it seems to have entered in a new era of communication by the use of social media networks, more so since its allegiance to Daesh. To spread their principles this terrorist group uses the Internet and adapts Daesh communication strategies to the sub-Saharan African context to spread its propaganda (also in French and English) with more sophisticated videos. By its presence on the most used digital networks (Twitter, Instagram), Boko Haram breaks with traditional forms of communication in the region such as propaganda videos sent to agencies on flash drives or CD-ROM. Video content analyses has also shown a major shift from long monologues from the leader Abubakar Shekau, that had poor editing and translation, to messages and videos that have increased its attractiveness among sub-Saharan youth. Today, Boko-Haram owns a real communications agency called «al-Urwa Wuqta» (literally «the most trustworthy», «the most reliable way»). Moreover, the group multiplies its activities on Twitter especially via their smartphones, as well as through YouTube news channels. Most tweets and comments of the group's supporters denounce the Nigerian government and call for support for Boko Haram movement. The tweets are written in Arabic at first and then translated and passed on into English and French, which reflect the group's desire to place itself in the context of what it sees as global jihad. In a recent study conducted in 2015, researchers have shown how Boko Haram-related tweets include rejection of the movement by non-members of the organisation.

In Kenya, and by extension the Horn of Africa, online radicalization and recruitment processes are dependent on narrative formations and dissemination. However, other than one documented case of purely online radicalization and recruitment, evidence shows that the process is cyclic involving both an online-offline-online, process that advances depending on the level of socialization and resonance factors shared with the vulnerable populations. A recent study from Scofield Associates shows that narrative formation depends on three major attributes; having a believable story, actionable plans for those who encounter it, and the need for a religious cover. The third characteristic provides support to the persuasion process and adds to the global whole. The persuasion process plays out very well with an Online platform or audience.

Online prevention initiatives

Alternative narratives 
Van Eerten, Doosje, Konijn, De Graaf, and De Goede suggest that counter or alternative narratives could be a promising prevention strategy. Some researchers argue that a strong alternative narrative to violent jihadist groups is to convey the message that they mostly harm Muslims. During the last decade, the United States government has set up two online programs against radicalization designed to counter anti-American propaganda and misinformation from al-Qaeda or the Islamic state. These programs seek to win the "war of ideas" by countering self-styled jihadist rhetoric.

Private sector counter-initiatives involve the YouTube Creators for Change with young "ambassadors" mandated to "drive greater awareness and foster productive dialogue around social issues through content creation and speaking engagements"; the "redirectmethod.org" pilot initiative to use search queries in order to direct vulnerable young people to online videos of citizen testimonies, on-the-ground reports, and religious debates that debunk narratives used for violent recruitment. The initiative avoids "government-produced content and newly or custom created material, using only existing and compelling YouTube content".

Several governments are opting to invest in primary prevention through education of the public at large, and of young public in particular, via various "inoculatory" tactics that can be grouped under the broad label of Media and Information Literacy (MIL). Based on knowledge about the use of MIL in other domains, this initiative can be seen, interalia, as a long term comprehensive preventive strategy for reducing the appeal of violent radicalization.

Media and information literacy 
MIL has a long tradition of dealing with harmful content and violent representations, including propaganda. In its early history, MIL was mostly put in place to fight misinformation (particularly in advertising) by developing critical skills about the media. By the 1980s, MIL also introduced cultural and creative skills to use the media in an empowering way, with active pedagogies. Since the year 2000, MIL has enlarged the media definition to incorporate the Internet and social media, adding issues related to ethical uses of online media to the traditional debates over harmful content and harmful behavior and aligning them more with the perspectives that consider issues of gratifications of media users.

International human rights standards

References

Sources 

 

Information and communications technology
Social media
Youth
Radicalization